David Michael Webb (born 29 August 1965) is an activist investor, share market analyst and retired investment banker based in Hong Kong.

Early life 
Webb graduated in Mathematics from Exeter College, Oxford in 1986. From 1981 to 1986 he was also an author of books and games for early home computers, particularly the ZX Spectrum. He authored the Pac Man type game Spookyman and went on to create the acclaimed 3D Vector graphics game Starion on the Spectrum.

After graduation he became an investment banker in London. He moved to Hong Kong in 1991. He retired from investment banking in 1998, and now lobbies extensively for increased transparency and public accountability of directors of public companies as well as for the Government of Hong Kong.

Webb was appointed a Deputy Chairman of the Hong Kong Securities and Futures Commission's Takeover and Mergers Panel on 1 April 2013, having commenced serving as member on 1 April 2001.

Activism 
Webb has been referred to as the "'Long Hair' of the financial markets" (in an allusion to Leung Kwok-hung), but his activism is not purely restricted to the finance sector. He uses his eponymous webb-site.com as his official mouthpiece on all matters commercial and political.

In 2003, he launched "Project Poll", in which he purchased 10 shares in each of the 33 constituents of the Hang Seng Index, registering them in 5 names (himself, his wife and 3 BVI companies he owned) and used company law to demand poll voting (1 share, 1 vote) rather than a show of hands in all their shareholder meetings. This eventually led to a change of Hong Kong Listing Rules to require poll voting in all companies from 2009 onwards. Also in 2003, he launched Project VAMPIRE (Vote Against Mandate for Placings, Issues by Rights Excepted), to oppose resolutions that allow for massive issues of shares for cash without offering them to existing shareholders, negating pre-emption rights.

In December 2005, he advocated widening the electorate of the functional constituencies, arguing that professionals in fields such as bankers and stockbrokers should get to elect their own representatives. He observed then that only accountants, lawyers, doctors and teachers are able to exercise that right; stockbrokers are represented by convicted fraudster Chim Pui-chung, whilst the banking seat has only been contested once in 20 years. During the 2014 Hong Kong protests, he said that the economic impact of the protests was minor compared to the large economic benefits of a more dynamic economy that would come from democracy, ending collusion between the Government and the tycoons who currently elect the Chief executive.

Hong Kong Stock Exchange 
Webb argues that there is inherently conflict between the commercial and regulatory roles of the Hong Kong Stock Exchange, and has been arguing for a super-regulatory authority to assume that role. In the meantime, he argues for improved investor representation on the Hong Kong Stock Exchange. He was elected an independent non-executive director of Hong Kong Exchanges and Clearing Ltd. in 2003, and was re-elected by a landslide in April 2006.

In early 2007, Webb spoke up against the vested interests of smaller local stockbrokers acting against investors' interests, and was the only member to vote against reversing the decision by the former board of directors to cut minimum trading spreads for equities and warrants trading at between 25 HK cents and HK$2. The reforms were to be implemented in the first quarter, but were put back on the table following protests by brokers.

In September 2007, the government increased its stake in the Exchange from 4.41% to 5.88%. The Government declared the stake would be held by the Exchange Fund as a "strategic asset".

Webb remarked that the government was the second-largest single investor in the Hong Kong market after Beijing, with a portfolio of local equities estimated to be worth about HK$150 billion. He said the purchase violated the government's stated principle of "big market, small government". On top of already having its own appointed directors, the Government exercised its 63 million share-votes on directors' appointments as a shareholder at General Meeting in April 2008. Webb suggested that "As a 'strategic' investor, the government shouldn't have voted".

In May 2008, Webb resigned one year prior to the expiry of his term as an independent non-executive director, citing backdoor politics by the Government to install a professional board that would exclude retail investors and adopt more flexible standards for new listings; he also slammed the management for withholding information, which the management denies.

Cyberport 
The Hospital Hong Kong government's project to develop a business Park called "Cyberport" was controversially granted to PCCW, controlled by Richard Li, son of Hong Kong's wealthiest man Li Ka-Shing, without the benefit of a formal tender. In October 2004, Webb cited lack of transparency in the government's business dealings and demanded audited financial accounts and directors' reports for three companies related to the project, namely Hong Kong Cyberport Development Holdings Ltd., Hong Kong Cyberport Management Ltd. and Hong Kong Cyberport (Ancillary Development) Ltd., to be released under the non-statutory Code on Access to Information.

Disneyland 
In 2005, Webb criticised the government for its lack of accountability, through its refusal to uphold a promise of independent directors on the board of Hong Kong Disneyland. The Hong Kong Government was heavily involved in the project, and is the company's 57% shareholder.

Other work 
From 1999 to 2008, Webb made public an annual Christmas share tip where he recommended a single undervalued but well-run company. His picks are believed to have strongly influenced the price of selected stocks. However, The Standard criticised Webb after reporting that he himself owned holdings in his own Christmas share tip (which he had always disclosed), in one case giving himself almost a 40% unrealised profit on his holdings the day following publication of the tip. In December 2009, he announced an end to the "Christmas Pick" after a 10-year run in which they returned a cumulative 1118%, compared with an 87% return in the Hang Seng Index over that period, saying that the success of the picks "has become something of a distraction" to the main goal of raising the standards of Hong Kong's corporate and economic governance.

Webb was named as a "Gadfly" in CFO Magazine's Global 100 in 2002.

Personal life 
Webb is married to Karen Anne Webb; they have two children together. On 8 June 2020, he announced on his website, webb-site.com, that he has been diagnosed of metastatic prostate cancer and will step back from in-depth research on listed companies.

References

External links 
 

British activists
Alumni of Exeter College, Oxford
Sustainability advocates
Hong Kong financial businesspeople
Living people
1965 births